In group theory, 
the Tits group 2F4(2)′, named for  Jacques Tits, is a finite simple group of order
   211 · 33 · 52 · 13 = 17,971,200.

It is sometimes considered a 27th sporadic group.

History and properties
The first member of this series 2F4(2) is not simple. It was studied by  who showed that it is almost simple, its derived subgroup 2F4(2)′ of index 2 being a new simple group, now called the Tits group. The group 2F4(2) is a group of Lie type and has a BN pair, but the Tits group itself does not have a BN pair. The Tits group is member of the infinite family 2F4(22n+1)′ of commutator groups of the Ree groups, and thus by definition not sporadic. But because it is also not strictly a group of Lie type, it is sometimes regarded as a 27th sporadic group.

The Schur multiplier of the Tits group is trivial and its outer automorphism group has order 2, with the full automorphism group being the group 2F4(2).

The Tits group occurs as a maximal subgroup of the Fischer group Fi22. The groups 2F4(2) also occurs as a maximal subgroup of the Rudvalis group, as the point stabilizer of the rank-3 permutation action on 4060 = 1 + 1755 + 2304 points.

The Tits group is one of the simple N-groups, and was overlooked in John G. Thompson's first announcement of the classification of simple N-groups, as it had not been discovered at the time. It is also one of the thin finite groups.

Maximal subgroups

 and  independently found the 8 classes of maximal subgroups of the Tits group as follows:

L3(3):2  Two classes, fused by an outer automorphism. These subgroups fix points of rank 4 permutation representations.

2.[28].5.4 Centralizer of an involution.

L2(25)

22.[28].S3

A6.22 (Two classes, fused by an outer automorphism)

52:4A4

Presentation
The Tits group can be defined in terms of generators and relations by

where [a, b] is the commutator a−1b−1ab. It has an outer automorphism obtained by sending (a, b) to (a, b(ba)5b(ba)5).

Notes

References

External links
 ATLAS of Group Representations — The Tits Group

Sporadic groups

de:Gruppe vom Lie-Typ#Die Tits-Gruppe